Bibbo (born Ishrat Sultana 1906 – 1972) was a music composer, singer and actress who worked in both Indian and Pakistani films. She acted in Indian cinema from 1933 to 1947 before moving to Pakistan, following Partition of India in 1947. She started her acting career with Ajanta Cinetone Ltd. in 1933, working with directors like M. D. Bhavnani and A. P. Kapoor. She was one of the top leading ladies of the 1930s along with actresses like Devika Rani, Durga Khote, Sulochana, Mehtab, Shanta Apte, Sabita Devi, Leela Desai and Naseem Banu. She was referred to as "one of the most important female stars of the 1930s and 1940s". Her fame had her featured in the lyrics of a popular song from the film Gharib Ke Lal (1939) sung by Mirza Musharraf and Kamla Karnataki, with music by Sagheer Asif and lyrics by Rafi Kashmiri. "Tujhe Bibbo Kahoon Ke Sulochana" (Should I call you Bibbo or Sulochana), where Sulochana referred to another popular actress of the time. This was the first time a song featuring famous actors was used in the lyrics of a film song.

Bibbo became the first female music composer of Indian cinema, when she composed the music for Adal-e-Jahangir in 1934, a year before Jaddanbai, mother of actress Nargis, composed music for Talash-e-Haq (1935). She was also the music director for a second film called Qazzak Ki Ladki (1937).

She worked with actors like Master Nissar, Surendra and Kumar. She formed a popular working relationship with them. Her pairing with Surendra was especially well-liked with the pair giving several hits like Manmohan (1936), Jagirdar (1937), Gramaphone Singer (1938), Dynamite (1938) and Ladies Only (1939). Her first film was Rangila Rajput, followed by Mayajaal, both in 1933. She worked in nearly thirty films as a lead actress in India from 1933 to 1947, shifting to character roles in later years, following her move to Pakistan. She won the Nigar Award for the best character actress for her role in the Pakistani film Zehr-e-Ishq (1958).

Early life
Bibbo was born Ishrat to a famous singer Hafeezan Begum.  She was cited as being a famous singer from Delhi who came to Bombay to join films. Bibbo was a trained singer with a "coarse husky quality" like Zohrabai Ambalewali and Shamshad Begum.

Career

In India
Bibbo's first recorded film was the successful Rangila Rajput (The Gay Cavalier) (1933), directed by M. D. Bhavnani and starring Master Nissar, with popular music by B. S. Hoogan. Her second film that year for Ajanta was Mayajaal, a fantasy directed by Shanti L. Dave for Ajanta Cinetone Ltd., co-starring Master Nissar, P. Jairaj and Shahzadi, with music composed by B. S. Hoogan. Her acting was appreciated by the Hindi journalist Pitambar Jha, who predicted a bright future for her in his article in the Hindi magazine, Chitrapat 1934.

In 1934, Bibbo acted in five films. Vasavdatta or the Shahi Gawaiya (The Royal Musician) was her third film. It was produced by Ajanta and directed by P. Y. Altekar, with B. Sohni and Jairaj as co-stars. The music was by B. S. Hoogan. The story revolved around King Udyan, who is obsessively in love with his wife, ignoring his kingdom in the process. She was then cast in her fourth film, M. D. Bhavnani's Sair-E-Paristan, produced by Ajanta Cinetone Ltd. and co-starring P. Jairaj, Khalil Aftab, Master Nissar and W. M. Khan. A fantasy, the story was about three Princes falling in love with the same girl. The music was composed by B. S. Hoogan.

It was in 1934, that Bibbo composed music for a film called Adal-e-Jehangir, thus becoming the first Indian female composer. The Mill, also called Mazdoor was directed by M. D. Bhavnani (Mohan Dayaram Bhavnani), and starred Bibbo, who played the mill owner's daughter in the film with Motilal as the hero. The film was controversial and was banned for a few years.

In 1936, she acted in Garib Parivar and Manmohan. She was cast by Mehboob Khan in Manmohan, a film made to compete with Calcutta's New Theatres Ltd famous film Devdas. Her co-star was Surendra and the film went on to become a commercial success with the songs becoming popular.

1937 saw her acting in four films, out of which Jagirdar, directed by Mehboob Khan and co-starring Surendra, was the most famous. The film was a "romantic melodrama", with Bibbo and Surendra playing actor Motilal's parents in the latter part. Though made on a small budget, it went on to do big business commercially for Sagar Movietone. She acted in, and once again composed music for the film Qazzak Ki Ladki, using the name Ishrat Sultana as composer. The film co-starred Surendra and was directed by Sultan Mirza and S. Varman for Rainbow Films.

1938 proved to be a successful year for her with all five films doing well at the box office. Watan, produced by Sagar Studios and directed by Mehboob Khan was a quasi-historical costume drama involving Tartars, with a nationalistic element. The film starred Kumar, Yakub and Maya Bannerjee with music by Anil Biswas.

Gramaphone Singer (1938) and Dynamite (1938), had her pairing with Surendra again. Both films went on to become successful. Gramaphone Singer was a love triangle directed by V. C. Desai, which had Bibbo playing the other woman, with Prabha playing Surendra's wife. Teen Sau Din Ke Baad, also called 300 Days And After, was a Sagar film directed by Sarvottam Badami. It had Motilal, Sabita Devi and Yakub starring with Bibbo. With music by Anil Biswas, the film went on to do well. Baburao Patel of Filmindia called it "easily the best picture to come out of Sagar".

In 1939, Ladies Only co-starred Bibbo with Prabha, Sabita Devi and Surendra in a comedy film directed by Sarvottam Badami for Sagar Movietone. The music was composed by Anupam Ghatak. According to Filmindia editor Baburao Patel, Bibbo in her role "shines out with her vigorous performance". Laxmi with Kumar, Maya, Gope, Jeevan and Indira was directed by Mohan Sinha, with music composed by Timir Baran. The Times of India review quoted in Filmindia commented: "Bibbo is brilliant as the other woman and very nearly steals the picture with her wonderfully sympathetic role".

Sneh Bandhan had Bibbo pairing with Navin Yagnik and E. Billimoria in a melodrama about love and sacrifice. Bibbo's acting was lauded with the reviewer commenting "Never before has she looked so charming and… never before has she acquitted herself so well in her work. She takes the complete burden of the drama and gives a beautiful performance throughout".

Akela (1941) released in 1941, starred Bibbo with Mazhar Khan and E. Billimoria. The film was produced by Kikubhai Desai and directed by Pesi Karani. The film described as a sensible picture for the intelligentsia and the masses, was a big success commercially.

In 1945 she acted in Zeenat, starring Noor Jehan, the film went on to become a big hit for Noor Jehan.	It was directed by Shaukat Hussain Rizvi with music composed by Mir Saheb. Pehli Nazar was another film in 1945 opposite Veena, Munawwar Sultana and Motilal. Directed by Mazhar Khan for Mazhar Art, it had music by Anil Biswas. Bibbo's last film in India was Pahela Pyar (First Love) (1947), directed by A. P. Kapoor for Sagar Movietone.

In Pakistan
Bibbo shifted to Pakistan following partition of India in 1947. She started working in films there as a character artist doing about twelve films from 1950 to 1966.

Her first film in Pakistan was Shammi (1950), a Punjabi picture directed by Munshi Dil. She co-starred with Shammi, Santosh and Ajmal. It had music composed by Master Inayat Hussain.

Dupatta (1952), was an Urdu film directed by Sibtain Fazli and produced by Aslam Lodhi. It starred Noor Jehan, Sudhir, Ajay Kumar and Yasmin along with Bibbo. The film was acclaimed as a big hit commercially and had music composed by Firoz Nizami, with songs sung by Noor Jehan.

Zahr-e-Ishq was released in April 1958. Produced by Khurshid Anwar and Sultan Jilani under the banner of Select Pictures, it starred Musarrat Nazir, Habib, Yasmin, Neelo and Bibbo. The music was by Khurshid Anwar, with lyrics by Qateel Shifai. Hailed as an "excellent film" by the reviewer, it won Bibbo the Nigar Award for best character actress.

Jhoomer is a 1959 film directed by Masud Pervez, with music composed Khurshid Anwar. Produced by Anwar for Noor Minar Pictures banner, it starred Musarrat Nazir, Sudhir and Laila.

Ghunghat (1962), a suspense-thriller drama, was directed by Khurshid Anwar, who also wrote the story and composed the music. The cast included Nayyar Sultana, Santosh, Neelo, Laila and Bibbo.

Bibbo acted in a few more films, with Fanoos (1963) and Ghalib being commendable from her acting point of view, though the films did not do well commercially. Her last cited film is Armaan (1966), directed by Parvez Malik, with music by Sohail Rana.

Personal life
Bibbo was married by the end of the 1930s to Khalil Sardar, who directed her in Adal-e-Jahangir, for which she gave music. Following the marriage, they left Bombay and moved to Lahore, where they produced a film under the banner of Rainbow films, Qazzak Ki Ladki (1937), where she was also the music director. The film was a commercial failure and Bibbo finally returned to Bombay. Following Partition in 1947, Bibbo moved to Pakistan, where she worked as a character artiste. According to Zulqarnain Shahid (The Weekly MAG, Pakistan) re-published in Cineplot, it was stated that Bibbo was married to Shahnawaz Bhutto, Zulfiqar Ali Bhutto's father. In the June 1943 issue of Filmindia, Baburao Patel answered a query about Bibbo claiming she was "indeed married to Bhutto".

The last days of Bibbo's life are claimed to have been lonely, with her life described as being "miserable and poverty stricken". She died on 25 May 1972.

Filmography

In India
Her films list:

In Pakistan
Her films list:

Awards and recognition

References

External links

 Bibbo Rare Picture: https://www.flickr.com/photos/rashid_ashraf/31225553980/in/dateposted/

1906 births
20th-century Indian composers
Indian emigrants to Pakistan
1972 deaths
20th-century Indian singers
Actresses in Hindi cinema
20th-century Pakistani women singers
Muhajir people
20th-century women composers
Indian film actresses
20th-century Indian actresses
Pakistani women composers
20th-century Indian women musicians
20th-century Pakistani actresses
Actresses from Delhi
Pakistani film actresses
20th-century Indian women singers
Actresses in Urdu cinema
Pakistani women singers
Pakistani film score composers
Nigar Award winners
Actresses in Punjabi cinema
Pakistani composers
Actresses in Sindhi cinema